John Train may refer to:
John Train (investment advisor) (1928–2022), investment advisor and writer
John Train (politician) (1873–1942), Unionist Party (Scotland) MP for Glasgow Cathcart
John Butler Train, pseudonym of singer Phil Ochs (1940-1976)